Rhynchoferella syncentra is a moth of the Copromorphidae family. It is found in Madagascar and South Africa, where it is known from  Kwazulu-Natal, Mpumalanga and Gauteng.

Meyrick described this species as follows:

Male 32 mm. Head and thorax pale greyish-ocherous. Abdomen grey. Forewings very elongate-triangular, costa slightly arched, faintly sinuate in middle, apex very obtusely rounded, termen rounded, little oblique; pale brownish-ochreous, irregularly suffused with fuscous towards costa, posterior half of wing sprinkled with dark fuscous specks with some fuscous suffusion, terminal edge suffused with fuscous: cilia fuscous. Hindwings pale greyish; cilia whitish, with faint greyish basal shade.

References

Copromorphidae
Moths described in 1916
Moths of Madagascar
Moths of Africa
Insects of Namibia